Colburn is the name of some places in the U.S. state of Wisconsin:

Colburn, Adams County, Wisconsin, a town
Colburn, Chippewa County, Wisconsin, a town
Colburn (community), Wisconsin, an unincorporated community